Euglandina is a genus of predatory medium- to large-sized, air-breathing, land snails, terrestrial pulmonate gastropod mollusks in the family Spiraxidae.

These snails were previously placed in the family Oleacinidae (according to the taxonomy of the Gastropoda by Bouchet & Rocroi, 2005).

Euglandina is the type genus of the subfamily Euglandininae. The pulmonate genus Euglandina is often referred to as Glandina in older literature, and the most widely known species, Euglandina rosea, may commonly be found under the synonym Glandina truncata.

These snails are especially notable for being carnivorous and predatory. They are sometimes called "wolf snails" for that reason.

Distribution
The natural range of Euglandina encompasses much of the tropical and subtropical Western Hemisphere, including the Southeastern United States to Texas, Mexico, and various locations in Central and South America. The species E. rosea has been intentionally introduced into many other warm areas — from Hawaii to New Guinea, Bermuda, Sri Lanka, Mauritius, and numerous other locations — in a vain attempt to control accidentally introduced species of snails, usually the giant African Achatina fulica.

Those species of Euglandina that are not indigenous to the USA have not yet become established there, but they are considered to represent a potentially serious threat as a pest, an invasive species that could negatively affect agriculture, natural ecosystems, human health, or commerce. Therefore,  these species should be given top national quarantine significance in the USA.

Species 

The three subgenera and species in the genus Euglandina include:

Subgenus Euglandina Crosse & Fischer, 1870
Euglandina anomala (Angas, 1879) 
Euglandina aurata (Morelet, 1849) - type species
Euglandina aurantiaca Angas, 1879 
 Euglandina bailyi M. Smith, 1950
 Euglandina binneyana (Pfeiffer, 1845)
Euglandina broctontomlini Pilsbry, 1926 
 Euglandina cognata (Strebel, 1875)
 Euglandina cuneus (Von Martens, 1891)
Euglandina cumingi cumingi Beck, 1837 
Euglandina cumingi rubromarginata Martens, 1891
Euglandina cylindracea Phillips, 1846
 Euglandina dactylus (Broderip, 1832)
 Euglandina daudebarti (Deshayes, 1850)
 Euglandina daudebarti amoena (Von Martens, 1865)
 Euglandina daudebarti jalapana (Von Martens, 1891)
 Euglandina daudebarti miradorensis (Strebel, 1878)
 Euglandina gigantea Pilsbry, 1926
 Euglandina huingensis (Pilsbry, 1903)
 Euglandina immemorata Pilsbry, 1907
 Euglandina indusiata (Pfeiffer, 1860)
Euglandina isabellina Pfeiffer, 1846) 
 Euglandina lamyi (Fischer & Chatelet, 1903)
 Euglandina liebmanni (Pfeiffer, 1846)
 Euglandina livida Dall, 1908
 Euglandina michoacanensis (Pilsbry, 1899)
Euglandina mitriformis (Angas, 1879) 
Euglandina monilifera Pfeiffer, 1845 
Euglandina monilifera pulcherrima Pfeiffer, 1845  
 Euglandina pan Thompson, 1987
 Euglandina pilsbryi Bartsch, 1909
 Euglandina pinicola (Fischer & Crosse, 1870)
Euglandina pittieri (Martens, 1901) 
 Euglandina radula (Strebel, 1875)
 Euglandina rosea (Férussac, 1821)
 Euglandina sowerbyana (Pfeiffer, 1846)
 Euglandina sowerbyana estephaniae (Strebel, 1875)
 Euglandina striata (Müller, 1774)
 Euglandina texasiana (Pfeiffer, 1856)
 Euglandina texasiana angustior Pilsbry & Vanatta, 1936
 Euglandina titan Thompson, 1987
 Euglandina vanuxemensis (Lea, 1834)

Subgenus Singleya H. B. Baker, 1941
 Euglandina anomala (Angas, 1879)
 Euglandina anomala barrocoloradensis Pilsbry, 1930
 Euglandina balesi Pilsbry, 1938
 Euglandina candida (Shuttleworth, 1852)
 Euglandina candida conularis (Pfeiffer, 1855)
 Euglandina carminensis (Morelet, 1849)
 Euglandina corneola (W. G. Binney, 1857)
 Euglandina decussata (Deshayes, 1840)
 Euglandina excavata (Von Martens, 1891)
 Euglandina ghiesbreghti (Pfeiffer, 1856)
 Euglandina hererrae (Contreras, 1923)
 Euglandina insignis (Pfeiffer, 1855)
 Euglandina jacksoni Pilsbry & Vanatta, 1936
 Euglandina longula (Fischer & Crosse, 1870)
 Euglandina lowei Pilsbry, 1931
 Euglandina mazatlanica (Von Martens, 1891)
 Euglandina mazatlanica abbreviata (Von Martens, 1891)
 Euglandina pseudoturris (Strebel, 1875)
 Euglandina singleyana (W. G. Binney, 1878)
 Euglandina tenella (Strebel, 1875)
 Euglandina turris (Pfeiffer, 1846)
 Euglandina turris longurio Pilsbry & Cockerell, 1926
 Euglandina wani (Jacobson, 1968)

Subgenus Cosmomenus H. B. Baker, 1941
 Euglandina cumingi (Beck, 1827)
 Euglandina cylindracea (Phillips, 1846)

 Species brought into synonymy
 Euglandina exesa Cockerell, 1930 - fossil: synonym of Euglandina singleyana (W. G. Binney, 1892)

Description
The various species of Euglandina are similar in numerous ways. The shells are simple, oval in outline (sometimes broadly so), but occasionally more-or-less straight-sided, the lip of the aperture is also simple, without any thickening. These shells may be brown, orange, or pink in color, or some intermediate shade. Shell sculpture when present usually consists of striae that mark progressive growth increments. All species are carnivores, and probably have essentially the same hunting and feeding strategies, and reproductive techniques.

Habitat
Members of this genus can be found in many microhabitats. They can be found in semitropical moist jungle, and in near-desert. Their only requirements seem to be a relatively warm climate, and the presence of a sufficient supply of food.

References

Further reading 

 Hubricht L. (1985). "The distribution of the native land mollusks of the eastern United States". Fieldiana Zoology 24: 1-191.
 Perez K. & Strenth N. E. (2003). "A systematic review of the land snail Euglandina singleyana (Binney, 1892) (Mollusca: Gastropoda: Spiraxidae)". Proc. Biol. Soc. Washington 116(3): 649-660.
 Perez K. & Strenth N. E. (2002). "Enzymatic variation in the land snail Euglandina texasiana (Gastropoda: Pulmonata) from south Texas and northeastern Mexico". Texas J. Science, 1 February 2002.

Spiraxidae